Fresenius Medical Care AG & Co. KGaA is a German healthcare company which provides kidney dialysis services through a network of 4,171 outpatient dialysis centers, serving 345,425 patients. The company primarily treats end-stage renal disease (ESRD), which requires patients to undergo dialysis 3 times per week for the rest of their lives.

With a global headquarters in Bad Homburg vor der Höhe, Germany, and a North American headquarters in Waltham, Massachusetts, it has a 38% market share of the dialysis market in the United States. It also operates 42 production sites, the largest of which are in the U.S., Germany, and Japan.

The company is 32% owned by Fresenius and, as of 2020, generates around 50% of the group’s revenue.

The company is on the Best Employers List published by Forbes.

History
In 1996, Fresenius SE & Co. KGaA merged its dialysis business into W.R. Grace's National Medical Care to form Fresenius Medical Care.

In 2000, the company pleaded guilty to billing Medicare for unnecessary medical tests and to paying kickbacks for lab business and paid a $486 million fine.

In February 2012, the company acquired Liberty Dialysis Holding, which added 201 clinics, for $1.5 billion.

In March 2012, Rice Powell was appointed CEO.

In 2013, the company acquired Shiel Medical Laboratory, expanding services to New York City metro area. In December 2017, the company sold this business to Quest Diagnostics.

In February 2019, the company acquired NxStage, a U.S.-based maker of in-home dialysis devices, for $2 billion.

In March 2019, the company paid $231 million to the United States Department of Justice and the U.S. Securities and Exchange Commission to settle allegations of civil bribery to obtain business in 13 countries, including Angola, Saudi Arabia, Morocco, and Spain.

References

External links
 

Companies based in Hesse
Companies listed on the Frankfurt Stock Exchange
Health care companies established in 1996
German companies established in 1996
Health care companies of Germany
Medical and health organisations based in Hesse
Multinational companies headquartered in Germany
Private providers of NHS services
Bad Homburg vor der Höhe